Si Kai is a sub-district (tambon) 18 kilometers east of the provincial capital of Nong Khai in Nong Khai Province, Thailand.

Geography
The sub-district is in the northeast of Mueang Nong Khai District on the shore of the Mekong River, which is marks the northern boundary of the sub-district. To the west is Hin Ngom Sub-district, to the south Lao Tang Kham of Amphoe Phon Phisai, and to the east the sub-district Ban Duea.

History
The sub-district was created effective 1 August 1982 by splitting off seven villages from Hin Ngom Sub-district. The tambon administrative organization (TAO) as the local government unit was established on 13 February  1997.

Administration
The sub-administrative district consists of eight administrative villages (muban).

References

External links 
 http://seekai-nk.com/  Website of TAO (Thai)
 ThaiTambon

Populated places in Nong Khai province